The 1929 Minnesota Golden Gophers football team represented the University of Minnesota in the 1929 college football season. In their fourth year under head coach Clarence Spears, the Golden Gophers compiled a 6–2 record and outscored their opponents by a combined score of 179 to 55.

Bronko Nagurski was named an All-American at fullback and tackle by the Associated Press and Look. Nagurski and end Robert Tanner were named All-Big Ten first team.

Total attendance for the season was 204,083, which averaged to 34,014. The season high for attendance was against Michigan.

Schedule

References

Minnesota
Minnesota Golden Gophers football seasons
Minnesota Golden Gophers football